Yuko Otaka (born 23 May 1950) is a Japanese luger. She competed in the women's singles event at the 1972 Winter Olympics.

References

1950 births
Living people
Japanese female lugers
Olympic lugers of Japan
Lugers at the 1972 Winter Olympics
Sportspeople from Hokkaido